Juan Pablo Ramírez Velásquez (26 November 1997) is a Colombian footballer who plays as an attacking midfielder for Brazilian club América Mineiro, on loan from Atlético Nacional.

Club career
Ramírez was born in Rionegro, and started his career with his hometown club Deportivo Rionegro (later renamed Leones FC). He made his first team debut for the side on 11 May 2014, starting in a 0–2 Categoría Primera B away loss against Real Santander.

After featuring regularly for Leones in the 2014 Copa Colombia, Ramírez moved to Atlético Nacional in 2015 and returned to the youth setup. Promoted to the main squad for the 2016 campaign, he made his Categoría Primera A debut on 9 June of that year by coming on as a late substitute for Macnelly Torres in a 1–1 draw at Atlético Junior.

Ramírez scored his first professional goal on 2 July 2016, netting his team's first in a 3–3 away draw against Alianza Petrolera. He could not establish himself as a regular starter for the Verdolagas, and subsequently served loans at Deportivo Pasto and former side Leones before being recalled by Atlético Nacional in July 2018.

In February 2020, Ramírez moved to Atlético Bucaramanga on loan for the season. On 9 November, still owned by Atlético Nacional, he joined Brazilian Série A side Bahia on loan until December 2021.

Shortly after arriving at his new club, Ramírez tested positive for COVID-19. After being fully recovered from the disease, he made his debut for Bahia on 9 December in a 2–3 home loss against Defensa y Justicia.

On 20 December 2020, Ramírez was accused of racism by Gerson during a 3–4 away loss against Flamengo; in that match, he also scored Bahia's first goal. Ramírez denied the claims, as the incident led to the dismissal of Bahia manager Mano Menezes, while Ramírez was immediately separated from the first team. After the club's internal analysis of the case, which stated that they could not find any evidence of racial injury, he was brought back to the first team shortly after.

Career statistics

Honours
Atlético Nacional
Copa Colombia: 2016, 2018
Recopa Sudamericana: 2017
Copa Libertadores: 2016

Bahia
Copa do Nordeste: 2021

References

1997 births
Living people
Colombian footballers
Association football midfielders
Categoría Primera A players
Categoría Primera B players
Campeonato Brasileiro Série A players
Leones F.C. footballers
Atlético Nacional footballers
Deportivo Pasto footballers
Atlético Bucaramanga footballers
Esporte Clube Bahia players
América Futebol Clube (MG) players
Colombia under-20 international footballers
Colombia youth international footballers
Colombian expatriate footballers
Colombian expatriate sportspeople in Brazil
Expatriate footballers in Brazil
People from Rionegro
Sportspeople from Antioquia Department
21st-century Colombian people